Sean P. Swindell is a United States Army major general who serves as the Assistant Deputy Chief of Staff for Operations, Plans, and Training since July 2020. He previously served as the Special Assistant to the Director of the Army Staff from September 2019 to July 2020. He was the commander in charge of a bungled airstrike on a Doctors Without Borders hospital in Kunduz, Afghanistan, that left 42 civilians dead in 2015.

References

Living people
Place of birth missing (living people)
Recipients of the Defense Superior Service Medal
Recipients of the Legion of Merit
United States Army generals
United States Army personnel of the Gulf War
United States Army personnel of the Iraq War
United States Army personnel of the War in Afghanistan (2001–2021)
Year of birth missing (living people)